The Pleomassariaceae are a family of fungi in the order Pleosporales. Taxa have a widespread distribution in both temperate and tropical regions, and are saprobic or necrotrophic on wood, bark, and other herbaceous material. The genus was circumscribed by mycologist Margaret Elizabeth Barr-Bigelow in 1979.

Genera
This is a list of the genera in the Pleomassariaceae, based on a 2021 review and summary of fungal classification by Wijayawardene and colleagues. Following the genus name is the taxonomic authority (those who first circumscribed the genus; standardized author abbreviations are used), year of publication, and the number of species:
 Beverwykella  – 3 spp.
 Lichenopyrenis  – 1 sp.
 Myxocyclus  – 1 sp.
 Peridiothelia  – 3 spp.
 Pleomassaria  – 15 spp.
 Prosthemium  – ca. 8 spp.
 Splanchnonema  – 37 spp.

References

Pleosporales
Dothideomycetes families
Taxa named by Margaret Elizabeth Barr-Bigelow
Taxa described in 1979